Aníbal Santiago Acevedo (born April 28, 1971) is a Puerto Rican boxer, who won a bronze medal in the welterweight division at the 1992 Summer Olympics. A year earlier he won the bronze medal at the Pan American Games in Havana, Cuba.

Amateur highlights 
1989: Gold Medalist World Junior Championships in San Juan, Puerto Rico (beat Shane Mosley)
1991: Bronze Medal Pan Am Games Junior Welterweight
1991: Lost to Kostya Tszyu on points in World Championships in Sydney, Australia
1992: Gold Medal Santo Domingo Olympic Trials Welterweight (beat Guillermo Jones)
1992: Represented Puerto Rico as a welterweight at the Barcelona Olympic games. His results were:
Defeated Harry Simon (Namibia) 13-11
Defeated Stefen Scriggins (Australia) 16-3
Defeated Francisc Vaştag (Romania) 20-9
Lost to Juan Hernández Sierra (Cuba) 2-11

Professional career
Acevedo began his professional career in 1993 and has had limited success.  In 2006 he lost via TKO to Randy Griffin.  In February 2007 he lost by KO against Jarmine Mickey.

External links 
 
 Amateur Boxing - Panamerican Games (1991) - Havana, Cuba

1971 births
Living people
Boxers at the 1991 Pan American Games
Boxers at the 1992 Summer Olympics
Olympic boxers of Puerto Rico
Olympic bronze medalists for Puerto Rico
Welterweight boxers
Sportspeople from San Juan, Puerto Rico
Olympic medalists in boxing
Puerto Rican male boxers
Medalists at the 1992 Summer Olympics
Pan American Games bronze medalists for Puerto Rico
Pan American Games medalists in boxing
Medalists at the 1991 Pan American Games